The Mountain View Open was a golf tournament on the PGA Tour. It was played only one year, 1964, at the Mountain View Country Club in Corona, California. The tournament was won by Jack McGowan, his only PGA Tour win, by four strokes over R. H. Sikes.

Winners

References

Former PGA Tour events
Golf in California
Corona, California